Henry III and His Court is a play written by Alexandre Dumas (père), based on the life of Henry III of France. It was the author's first produced play. Its premier performance at the Comédie-Française on 10 February 1829 was attended by the Duke of Orléans, the future king Louis Philippe I. The play was met with great acclaim and is considered an important work in the development of romanticism in French theatre.

References

Works cited

External links
  (in French)

1829 plays
French-language plays
Plays by Alexandre Dumas